Boggs is a station on the Overbrook branch of Pittsburgh Regional Transit's light rail network. It is located in the Beltzhoover neighborhood of Pittsburgh.  Boggs is a high level handicap accessible station that exits onto Boggston Ave. and Sylvania Ave. The station serves commuters from the hilly, residential neighborhood.

History
Boggs was opened in 2004, one of eight new platform equipped stations which replaced thirty-three streetcar style stops along the Overbrook branch.

References

External links 

Port Authority T Stations Listings
Boggston Avenue entrance from Google Maps Street View

Port Authority of Allegheny County stations
Blue Line (Pittsburgh)
Silver Line (Pittsburgh)